Rhytiphora nigrovirens is a species of beetle in the family Cerambycidae. It was described by Edward Donovan in 1805, originally under the genus Saperda. It is known from Australia.

References

nigrovirens
Beetles described in 1805